St. Augustine Cathedral, located in Bridgeport, Connecticut, United States, is the seat of the Roman Catholic Diocese of Bridgeport.

History
St. Augustine's parish, established by Rev. Thomas J. Synnott, as St. James Church at Arch Street and Washington Avenue,  had become inadequate for the size of the congregation.  The cornerstone for the present church was laid on August 28, 1865 and the completed church was dedicated by Bishop McFarland on St. Patrick's Day in 1868.  It became a cathedral when the Diocese of Bridgeport was established in 1953.

The edifice went through a major $4 million renovation in 2003 and the capacity was expanded to 750 people.  The project was finished in 2004 with new marble tiles, repainted ceilings, a new altar, and other projects. On December 2, 2004, Archbishop Gabriel Montalvo, Apostolic Nuncio to the United States, celebrated the dedication Mass.  Bishop William E. Lori and 12 other bishops from around New England and New York concelebrated, in the presence of Cardinal Edward Egan of New York, and Cardinal William Keeler of Baltimore. Archbishop Daniel A. Cronin of Hartford delivered the homily.

In 2014 the pipe organ was rebuilt and expanded to 42 ranks by the A. Thompson-Allen Organ Company of New Haven, Connecticut.

Masses are currently said in English, Spanish, Vietnamese, and Latin (Extraordinary form of the Roman rite).

See also

List of Catholic cathedrals in the United States
List of cathedrals in the United States
History of Bridgeport, Connecticut

References

External links

 Official Cathedral Site
 Diocese of Bridgeport Official Site

Religious organizations established in 1842
Roman Catholic churches completed in 1868
Augustine, Saint, Bridgeport
Roman Catholic Diocese of Bridgeport
Roman Catholic churches in Bridgeport, Connecticut
Gothic Revival church buildings in Connecticut
Roman Catholic parishes of Diocese of Bridgeport
19th-century Roman Catholic church buildings in the United States